Aleksandr Sannikov (born 12 July 1971) is a Belarusian cross-country skier. He competed at the 1998 Winter Olympics and the 2002 Winter Olympics.

References

1971 births
Living people
Belarusian male cross-country skiers
Olympic cross-country skiers of Belarus
Cross-country skiers at the 1998 Winter Olympics
Cross-country skiers at the 2002 Winter Olympics
Sportspeople from Perm, Russia